In photography and videography, a matte box is a device attached to the end of a lens in order to prevent light leakage. It performs and mounts essentially the same as a lens hood, but usually includes adjustable fins called French flags.

Another purpose of a matte box is to hold filters in place in front of the lens. Some are supported by two rods that run the length of the camera, while others are supported by the lens itself.

A matte box may have a bellows, a rigid sunshade, or both. If both, the bellows is positioned within the rigid sunshade, having a mask which may be adjusted forward or backward to suit the angle of view of the camera system.

See also
 Barn doors – stage lights
 Lens hood – still camera

Further reading
  to Roger C. Field for a matte box having an adjustable mask with a bellows within a rigid sunshade. This has been manufactured by Chrosziel Filmtechnik near Munich for many years. 
  and a Canadian patent 2,468,702 to Robert D. Petroff for matte-box quick-assembly system that is fully modular, no-tool assembly system matte box, allowing to add or remove stages or adjust system components in seconds without the need of tools, manufactured by R. D. Petroff Inc.

Film and video technology